Kozloff may refer to:

People with the surname
Eugene N. Kozloff (1920–2017), American marine biologist and botanist.
Jake Kozloff (1901–1976), Russian-born American casino investor
Joyce Kozloff (born 1942), American artist
Lloyd M. Kozloff (1923–2012), American microbiologist and virologist
Max Kozloff (born 1933), American art historian.
Nikolas Kozloff (born 1969), American academic and journalist

Other
Kozloff Stoudt, American law firm based in Pennsylvania